Alternanthera is a genus of flowering plants in the family Amaranthaceae. It is a widespread genus with most species occurring in the tropical Americas, and others in Asia, Africa, and Australia. Plants of the genus may be known generally as joyweeds, or Joseph's coat. Several species are notorious noxious weeds.

Description
These are annual or perennial herbs or subshrubs. While some of the better-known species are aquatic plants, most are terrestrial. They take many forms, from prostrate to erect to floating. The leaves are oppositely arranged. The inflorescence is a spike or a rounded head occurring in the leaf axils or the ends of branches. The flowers have 5 tepals. There are 3 to 5 stamens which are fused into a rim at the bases, and 5 pseudostaminodes, appendages between the stamens that are not true staminodes. The fruit is a utricle containing one seed.

The genus Alternanthera contains both terrestrial and aquatic species. The photosynthetic pathway varies in this genus: Some species undergo C3 carbon fixation, one clade of 17 species has acquired the C4 pathway, and yet other species have an intermediate C3-C4 pathway.

Species

It is not yet clear how many species belong in the genus. Estimates range between 80 and 200.

Species include:
 Alternanthera acaulis Andersson
Alternanthera adscendens Suess.
Alternanthera albotomentosa Suess.
Alternanthera albida (Moq.) Griseb
Alternanthera albosquarrosa Suess.
Alternanthera albotomentosa Suess.
Alternanthera altacruzensis Suess.
Alternanthera angustifolia R.Br. – narrow-leaf joyweed
Alternanthera aquatica (Parodi) Chodat
Alternanthera arequipensis Suess.
Alternanthera areschougii
Alternanthera asterotricha Uline
Alternanthera axillaris (Willd.) DC.
Alternanthera bettzickiana – calico-plant
Alternanthera brasiliana (L.) Kuntze – Brazilian joyweed, ruby leaf
Alternanthera caracasana Kunth – mat chaff-flower, washerwoman
Alternanthera corymbiformis
Alternanthera crucis Bold. – West Indian joyweed
Alternanthera dentata – little ruby 
Alternanthera denticulata – lesser joyweed
Alternanthera echinocephala (Hook.f.) Christoph. – spiny-headed chaff flower, sea-urchin joyweed
Alternanthera ficoidea – parrot leaf
Alternanthera filifolia (Hook.f.) J.T. Howell
Alternanthera flavescens – yellow joyweed
Alternanthera flavicoma
Alternanthera galapagensis
Alternanthera grandis
Alternanthera hassleriana Chodat – Hassler's alternanthera
Alternanthera helleri (B.L.Rob.) J.T.Howell
Alternanthera littoralis P.Beauv.
Alternanthera maritima (Mart.) A.St.-Hil. – seaside joyweed
Alternanthera mexicana
Alternanthera nahui
Alternanthera nana – downy joyweed, hairy joyweed
Alternanthera nesiotes
Alternanthera nodiflora – common joyweed
Alternanthera olivacea
Alternanthera paronichyoides A.St.-Hil. – smooth joyweed
Alternanthera philoxeroides (Mart.) Griseb. – alligator weed
Alternanthera pubiflora
Alternanthera pungens
Alternanthera reineckii Briq.
Alternanthera sessilis (L.) DC. – rabbit-meat, sessile joyweed
Alternanthera snodgrassii
Alternanthera subscaposa
Alternanthera versicolor R.Br.

Ecology
Many species have been reported as noxious weeds, including A. angustifolia, A. caracasana, A. denticulata, A. nana, A. nodiflora, A. paronychioides, A. philoxeroides, A. sessilis, A. tenella, and A. triandra. The most important species is alligator weed (A. philoxeroides), a South American aquatic plant that has spread to other continents. It is a weed of many kinds of agricultural crops, it is an invasive species that degrades native habitat, and its dense mats of vegetation clog waterways, slowing shipping and increasing flooding. Alternanthera plants are known to produce allelopathic compounds that injure other plants, including crops.

Biological pest control agents now in use to reduce alligator weed infestations include the alligator weed flea beetle (Agasicles hygrophila), the alligator weed thrips (Amynothrips andersoni), and the alligator weed stem borer (Arcola malloi).

Uses
A. philoxeroides and A. sessilis are eaten as vegetables in parts of Asia.

Some Alternanthera are used as ornamental plants.

References

 
Amaranthaceae genera